"The Down Town" is a song by Days of the New and the second single from their self-titled debut album. Like its predecessor, the song reached #1 on Billboard's Mainstream Rock Tracks in 1998 and is a concert staple. "The Down Town" is also the third track on the band's Definitive Collection released in 2008.

The song is arguably the second most popular single from the band's debut album and certainly one of their best known songs overall. It is also one of the album's upbeat tracks while bearing an aggressive chorus. Lyrically, "The Down Town" ambiguously details a town of drug users who are afraid of change and suppressive of the narrator. The phrase "to bring me down" is rebelliously shouted throughout the chorus. A mention of pointless and rejected concern over another person's well-being is also addressed during the bridge. Given this theme of negativity, the "Down Town" song title may be intended as a double entendre or pun.

Music video
The "Down Town" video, directed by Lance Bangs, consists of a live concert performance. It retains the live audio and includes some notable differences from the studio recording; verse chords are used extensively in various parts, more punchy staccato is incorporated, and the first lyric of the bridge is changed to "I don't think that I should give a fuck about you." The performance lasts nearly a whole minute longer at 5:10.

Track listing
 "The Down Town (LP Version)"
 "The Down Town (Radio Remix Version)"
 "Touch, Peel And Stand (Live)"
 "Freak (Live)"

 The live tracks were recorded at the New World Music Theatre for Rock 103.5 Chicago's Rockstock '97 on September 6, 1997.

Chart positions

References

External links
"The Down Town" Music Video @ YouTube

1998 singles
1997 songs
Days of the New songs
Song recordings produced by Scott Litt
Songs written by Travis Meeks
Songs about drugs